Newton Mearns South and Eaglesham is one of the five wards used to elect members of the East Renfrewshire Council. It elects three Councillors.

Councillors

Election results

2022 election

2017 election

Notes

References

Wards of East Renfrewshire
Eaglesham
Newton Mearns